Travel Technology Interactive Group (also known as TTI)  is a French multinational company specializing in providing SaaS solutions for the transportation industry, with a focus on airline management. Their offering includes an Airline Reservations System with a built-in Global Distribution System (GDS) and web-based hosting, inventory, reservation, and revenue management solutions for low-cost, hybrid, and full-service airlines. TTI provides comprehensive and integrated SaaS software for airline management through Zenith® and enhances cargo management with Nexlog®.

The company was created in 2001, as a dedicated IT company for Air Antilles Express.
In 2005, it became an Amadeus IT Group worldwide business partner. In August 2006, it became an IATA StB Preferred Partner. The next year, it acquired a competitor in Latin America, CIONS Software, a Brazilian IT company based in Ribeirão Preto (Brazil) and renamed it TTI do Brasil. In November 2007, it opened its first subsidiary, TTI Caraïbes, based in Baie-Mahault (Guadeloupe). In May 2008, Travel Technology Interactive signed a cooperation agreement with Hahn Air for it to provide complementary BSP distribution services to Travel Technology Interactive's airline customers. In 2010, the company opened its subsidiary TTI Asia in Singapore.
On April 18, 2011, Travel Technology Interactive was listed on NYSE Alternext in Paris. In 2016, a new subsidiary, TTI Americas, opened in Panama.

Customers 

 Amelia International
 Air Chathams
 Fly Pelican
 Southern Airways Express
 Beond
 Air Calédonie
 Air Madagascar
 Hawaiian Airlines
 Southern Airways

See also 
 Amadeus IT Group
 Opodo
 Sabre
 Travelport
 Takeflite
 AeroCRS

References

External links

Companies listed on Euronext Paris
Travel and holiday companies of France
Information technology companies of France
French companies established in 2001
Hospitality companies established in 2001
Technology companies established in 2001
Travel technology
Companies based in Paris